Elections to Bury Council were held on 1 May 2008. One third of the council was up for election. The Conservative Party gained overall control of the council, from previous No Overall Control of any party.

After the election, the composition of the council was:
Conservative 26
Labour 16
Liberal Democrat 9

Election result

Ward results

Besses ward

Church ward

East ward

Elton ward

Holyrood ward

Moorside ward

North Manor ward

Pilkington Park ward

Radcliffe East ward

Radcliffe North ward

Radcliffe West ward

Ramsbottom ward

Redvales ward

Sedgley ward

St Marys ward

Tottington ward

Unsworth ward

References
Bury Council election, 2008 - wards B to P
Bury Council election, 2008 - wards R to U
Bury summary results

2008 English local elections
2008
2000s in Greater Manchester